KTT is a train set used by the MTR Corporation Limited in Hong Kong on the Guangdong Through Train route.

The double-deck "KTT" trailers have lower bottom floor than the ordinary cars serving on the same pair of tracks.

Route 
KTT is used on the Guangdong line (Hung Hom (Kowloon), Hong Kong - Changping - Guangzhou East) of the through train service.

Rolling stock 

KTT now has ten compartments (Eight first-class compartments and two executive-class compartments).

Since March 2018, all of the KTT coaches have begun the minor refurbishment. Refurbished train feature reupholstered seats, new flooring, added train automatic broadcast system device and improved barrier-free facilities. The refurbishment is excepted to finished at 2019.

See also 
 Guangshen Railway Company Xinshisu - former service from Guangdong to Hong Kong
 LRC (train)

References 

Kinki Sharyo rolling stock
MTR rolling stock
Rail transport in Guangdong